Mahlon R. Pitney IV (February 5, 1858 – December 9, 1924) was an American lawyer, jurist, and politician who served in the U.S. House of Representatives for two terms from 1895 to 1899. He later served as an associate justice of the U.S. Supreme Court from 1912 to 1922.

Early life and education
The American Pitney family dates back to 1720 when two Scots—Johnathan and James Pitney—settled the Pitney farm in Mendham Township, New Jersey. James's son, Mahlon Pitney, fought in the American Revolutionary War alongside George Washington.  Mahlon Pitney IV was born in Morristown, the son of Sarah Louise (née Halsted) and Henry Cooper Pitney. He attended the College of New Jersey, now Princeton University, where he was a classmate of Woodrow Wilson and served as manager of the campus baseball team. Upon graduation in 1879, he read law at his father's practice. Pitney passed the bar exam in 1882 and set up a private practice in Dover, working for a time in partnership with his brother, John Oliver Halstead Pitney.

He returned to Morristown in 1889 to assume control of his father's law firm, after Henry Pitney was appointed to a judgeship. Pitney married Florence Shelton in 1891. The couple had three children, and both of their sons attended Princeton University and later entered into the field of law. Pitney was the great-grandfather of actor Christopher Reeve on Reeve’s mother’s side, as well as his step great-grandfather on his father’s side.  Christopher Reeve’s maternal grandmother was Beatrice Pitney, and his paternal grandmother married Mahlon Pitney IV.

Political career
In 1894, Pitney ran for the United States House of Representatives. He defeated one-term incumbent Johnston Cornish for the seat from New Jersey's 4th congressional district, and was reelected to a second term two years later. Pitney served as chairman of the 1895 state Republican convention and pushed for the nomination of John W. Griggs as party gubernatorial candidate. A rising star in state politics, Pitney aspired to be elected as governor.  In order to further improve his local standing, he resigned from the House prior to the end of his second term and ran for election to the New Jersey Senate; Pitney was victorious in this 1889 race. In the legislature, he took on the role of party floor leader and, after the 1900 election, swayed body control to the Republicans. Later, Pitney became Senate President.

Judicial career
Despite Pitney’s desire to become the state’s chief executive, Governor Foster M. Voorhees supported a different candidate as his successor. In 1901 Voorhees offered Pitney a seat on the New Jersey Supreme Court, which rid Voorhees of a political rival while maintaining party unity. Seven years later, Pitney was elevated to the role of Chancellor of New Jersey, a unique judicial position under the state's 1844 constitution.

Supreme Court of the United States

Pitney was nominated by President William Howard Taft on February 19, 1912, to be an associate justice of the Supreme Court of the United States, to succeed John Marshall Harlan. He was confirmed by the U.S. Senate on March 13, 1912, by a 50–26 vote, and was sworn into office on March 18, 1912. Although confirmed by a wide margin, the nomination was opposed by progressives. This hostility was particularly due to Pitney's decision while serving as chancellor in Jones Glass Co. v. Glass Bottle Blowers Association, which limited the ability of unions to prevent their employers from using strikebreakers.

During his time on the court, Pitney developed a relatively conservative reputation and was an adherent of the judicial philosophy of substantive due process. This belief was exemplified in his majority opinion in Coppage v. Kansas, where, in ruling unconstitutional a Kansas statute banning anti-union yellow-dog contracts, the court stated that police power could not be legitimately utilized to ensure equality of bargaining power. Although distrustful of unions, Pitney also feared the rampant expansion of business and supported a broader use of the Sherman Antitrust Act.

Justice Pitney authored the majority opinion in New York Central Railroad Co. v. White, in which the Court upheld a New York state workman's compensation law and laid the foundation for the expansion of these programs nationwide. He also wrote the controversial majority opinion in Frank v. Mangum, which upheld the wrongful 1915 murder conviction of Leo Frank, a Jewish businessman, in Atlanta, Georgia, over the dissents of Justices Oliver Wendell Holmes and Charles Evans Hughes.
 
Pitney resigned from the court in 1922 after suffering a stroke. Alongside Willis Van Devanter, Pitney was one of only two Supreme Court Justices nominated by President Taft who also later served during Taft's tenure as chief justice.

Death and legacy
Pitney died in 1924 in Washington, D.C., and was interred at Evergreen Cemetery, in Morristown, New Jersey.

When asked which twentieth-century Supreme Court justice "has done the most to protect the core Constitutional values," Richard Epstein cited Justice Pitney, calling him "a great justice" and "the only consistent near-libertarian on the Supreme Court."

References

External links

Oyez.com biography for Mahlon Pitney
Supreme Court Justices: Mahlon Pitney (1858-1924)
History of Morris County New Jersey, Volume II
Facts on File biography for Mahlon Pitney

Mahlon Pitney at The Political Graveyard

|-

|-

1858 births
1924 deaths
20th-century American judges
American Presbyterians
Burials at Evergreen Cemetery (Morristown, New Jersey)
Republican Party New Jersey state senators
Justices of the Supreme Court of New Jersey
People from Morristown, New Jersey
Politicians from Morris County, New Jersey
Presidents of the New Jersey Senate
Princeton University alumni
Republican Party members of the United States House of Representatives from New Jersey
United States federal judges appointed by William Howard Taft
Justices of the Supreme Court of the United States
American libertarians